Arthur Chudleigh Beaumont "Chud" Langton (2 March 1912 – 27 November 1942) was a South African cricketer who played in 15 Tests from 1935 to 1939.  Jack Fingleton rated him amongst the best medium-paced bowlers he ever saw.

Langton was educated at King Edward VII School, Johannesburg. A tall, red-headed all-rounder, he came to prominence on the tour of England in 1935, when he made his Test debut. In the Second Test at Lord's he took 2 for 58 and 4 for 31 and made 44 batting at number eight in the second innings, valuable contributions to South Africa's first-ever Test victory in England, and subsequently to their 1–0 series victory. In the "Timeless Test" in Durban in 1938–39, he bowled 91 eight-ball overs, including 56 with a strapped back during the second innings, placing him fifth on the all-time list of most balls bowled in a Test: 728.

He died in Nigeria Protectorate at the age of 30 while serving as a flight lieutenant with the South African Air Force in World War II, when his Lockheed B34 Ventura bomber spun and crashed on landing.

References

External links

 
 Chud Langton at CricketArchive

1912 births
1942 deaths
Alumni of King Edward VII School (Johannesburg)
Cricketers from Pietermaritzburg
Gauteng cricketers
South Africa Test cricketers
South African Air Force officers
South African Air Force personnel of World War II
South African military personnel killed in World War II
Victims of aviation accidents or incidents in Nigeria